Diesellek TopkingBoxing (born May 9, 1985) is a Thai Muay Thai fighter. He is a former Rajadamnern Stadium, WPMF, IKF Champion.

Early career 
Born in Kalasin, near Roi Et, Thailand. Diessellek started fighting at the age of eleven. At the age of 15, he joined the Top King Boxing gym in Samutsakorn, 30 km south of Bangkok.

Career

Muaythai 

On 31 January 2015, won by decision against Samy Sana in Nancy, France.

On 3 March 2012, Diesellek knocked out current Lumpini Stadium and Rajadamnern Stadium champion Youssef Boughanem with his left kick at Lumpini Stadium.

On 20 June 2008, Diesellek wins IKF World Title against Marco Piqué in Montego Bay, Jamaica. The IKF stripped him of the title on September 15, 2017 due to inactivity.

Lethwei 
On 19 August 2018, at the occasion of the 3rd MLWC, Diesellek faced Lethwei World Champion Dave Leduc inside the Thein Pyu Stadium in Yangon, Myanmar. The matchup was mediatized as Lethwei vs Muaythai and Leduc won by knockout at 2:23 of the first round.

Titles and achievements 
 World Professional Muaythai Federation
 WPMF World Title
 International Kickboxing Federation
 IKF Light Middleweight World Champion
 Rajadamnern Stadium
 154 lbs Rajadamnern Stadium Champion

Muay Thai record 

|-  bgcolor="#fbb"
| 2020-01-05 || Loss ||align=left| Pawel Banasiak || Super Champ Muay Thai || Bangkok, Thailand || Decision  || 3 || 3:00
|-  bgcolor="#cfc"
| 2019-11-24 || Win ||align=left| Mohsen Kordalivand || Super Champ Muay Thai || Bangkok, Thailand || Decision  || 3 || 3:00
|-  bgcolor="#fbb"
| 2018-12-15 || Loss ||align=left| Yohan Lidon || La Nuit des Challenges || France || Decision || 5 || 3:00
|-  bgcolor="#cfc"
| 2018-10-28 || Win ||align=left| Keivan Soleimani || Super Champ Muay Thai || Bangkok, Thailand || Decision  || 3 || 3:00
|-  bgcolor="#fbb"
| 2016-11-27 || Loss ||align=left| Prum Somnang ||  World Kun Khmer Event||  Cambodia || Decision || 5 || 3:00
|-  bgcolor="#fbb"
| 2016-04-02 || Loss ||align=left| Toby Smith ||  Domination 17 || Australia || KO (Right Elbow)|| 3 || 
|-
|-  bgcolor="CCFFCC"
| 2015-10-24 || Win ||align=left| Tomas Mendez || Kings of Muay Thai 8 || Luxembourg || Decision  || 5 || 3:00
|-  bgcolor="#fbb"
| 2015-05-23 || Loss||align=left| Millad Farzad || Nemesis 10 || Australia || Decision (Split) || 5 || 3:00
|-  bgcolor="CCFFCC"
| 2015-01-31 || Win ||align=left| Samy Sana || Emperor Chok Dee || Nancy, France || Decision || 5 || 3:00
|-  bgcolor="CCFFCC"
| 2014-03-15 || Win ||align=left| Amadeu Christiano || King Naresuan Muay Thai || Australia|| Decision || 5 || 3:00
|-  bgcolor="CCFFCC"
| 2014-03-15 || Win ||align=left| Kim Olsen || Epic 10 Pressure || Australia|| Decision || 5 || 3:00
|-  bgcolor="CCFFCC"
| 2013-11-18 || Win ||align=left| Samuel Ballantyne || Nemesis || Australia|| Decision || 5 || 3:00
|-  bgcolor="CCFFCC"
| 2013-10-26 || Win ||align=left| Mark Lucchiri || Real Hero Muay Thai || Sydney, Australia|| Decision || 5 ||3:00
|-  bgcolor="CCFFCC"
| 2012-03-24 || Win ||align=left| Youssef Boughanem || Lumpini Stadium - Muaydee Vitheethai || Bangkok, Thailand || KO || 2 || 
|-
|-  bgcolor="#FFBBBB"
| 2011-06-11|| Loss ||align=left| Bing Xiang || Wushu vs. Muaythai ||  Hefei, China || Decision || 5 || 3:00
|-  bgcolor="#FFBBBB"
| 2011-05-28 || Loss ||align=left| Vladimir Moravcik || Profiliga MuayThai XI. ||  Banská Bystrica, Slovakia  || KO || 4 || 1:51
|-
|-  bgcolor="#fbb"
| 2011-02-19 || Loss ||align=left| Dernchonlek Sor Sor Niyom ||  Omnoi Stadium - Isuzu Tournament || Bangkok, Thailand || TKO (Knees)|| 3 ||
|-  bgcolor="#FFBBBB"
| 2010-06-05 || Loss ||align=left| Yohan Lidon || La Nuit Des Challenges 8 || Saint-Fons, France || Decision || 5 || 3:00
|-
|-  bgcolor="CCFFCC"
| 2010-01-05 || Win ||align=left| Prakaisaeng Sit Or. || Lumpini Stadium - Petchpiya || Bangkok, Thailand || Decision || 5 || 3:00
|-
|-  bgcolor="#FFBBBB"
| 2009-10-02 || Loss ||align=left| Steeve Valente ||  || Germany || Decision  || 5 || 3:00
|-  bgcolor="#FFBBBB"
| 2009-03-02 || Loss ||align=left| Kem Sitsongpeenong || Rajadamnern Stadium - Paorungchujaroen fights|| Bangkok, Thailand || Decision (Unanimous) || 5 || 3:00
|-
! style=background:white colspan=9 |
|-
|-  bgcolor="CCFFCC"
| 2009-01-21 || Win ||align=left| Jonathan Camara || Muaythai Federation WPMF World Title || Montego Bay, Jamaica || Decision || 5 || 3:00 
|-
! style=background:white colspan=9 |
|-
|-  bgcolor="CCFFCC"
| 2008-12-13 || Win ||align=left| Alex Schmitt || The Champions Club Germany 2008 || Bamberg, Germany || Decision || 5 || 3:00 
|-
|-  bgcolor="CCFFCC"
| || Win ||align=left| Attachai Fairtex ||  || Bangkok, Thailand || Decision || 5 || 3:00

|-  bgcolor="#fbb"
| 2008-08-16 || Loss||align=left| Steve Wakeling || Muay Thai Legnds|| United Kingdom || Decision || 5 || 3:00
|-  bgcolor="CCFFCC"
| 2008-06-20 || Win ||align=left| Marco Piqué || International Muay Thai Fight Night || Montego Bay, Jamaica || Decision || 5 || 3:00 
|-
! style=background:white colspan=9 |
|-
|-  bgcolor="CCFFCC"
| 2008-05 || Win ||align=left| Big Ben Chor Praram 6 || Rajadamnern Stadium || Bangkok, Thailand || Decision || 5 || 3:00 
|-
! style=background:white colspan=9 |

|-  bgcolor="#cfc"
| 2008-02-25 || Win ||align=left| Big Ben Chor Praram 6 || Jarumueng , Rajadamnern Stadium || Bangkok, Thailand || Decision || 5 || 3:00 

|-  bgcolor="CCFFCC"
| 2008-02-04 || Win ||align=left| Nontachai Sit-O || Rajadamnern Stadium || Bangkok, Thailand || Decision || 5 || 3:00

|-  bgcolor="#cfc"
| 2007-12-30 || Win ||align=left| Big Ben Chor Rachadakorn || Chucharoen + True Visions 62, Rajadamnern Stadium || Bangkok, Thailand || Decision || 5 || 3:00 

|-  bgcolor="#fbb"
|  || Loss||align=left| Masaki Sato || Lumpinee Stadium || Bangkok, Thailand || KO (Low Kicks)||  ||
|-  bgcolor="#cfc"
| || Win ||align=left| Saiyok Pumpanmuang ||  || Bangkok, Thailand || Decision || 5 || 3:00
|-  bgcolor="#fbb"
| || Loss||align=left| Saiyok Pumpanmuang ||  || Bangkok, Thailand || Decision || 5 || 3:00 
|-
| colspan=9 | Legend:

Lethwei record 

|-  bgcolor="#FFBBBB"
| 2018-08-19 || Loss ||align=left| Dave Leduc || 2018 Myanmar Lethwei World Championship || Yangon, Myanmar || KO || 1 || 2:23
|-
! style=background:white colspan=9 |
|-
| colspan=9 | Legend:

See also
List of male kickboxers

References

1985 births
Living people
Lightweight kickboxers
Muay Thai trainers
Welterweight kickboxers
Diesellek TopkingBoxing
Diesellek TopkingBoxing
Diesellek TopkingBoxing